Wortham is a census-designated place in St. Francois County, in the U.S. state of Missouri. As of 2010, Wortham's population is 279 making the growth rate 4.5%.

Demographics

History
Wortham was originally called "Cherrytown", and under the latter name was platted in 1904. A post office called Wortham was established in 1925, and remained in operation until 1969. An early postmaster, Ray Wortham, gave the community his last name.

References

Census-designated places in St. Francois County, Missouri